Ruchocinek  is a village in the administrative district of Gmina Witkowo, within Gniezno County, Greater Poland Voivodeship, in west-central Poland.

The village has a population of 380.

References

Ruchocinek